William or Bill Steele may refer to:

Bill Steele (baseball) (1885–1949), pitcher in Major League Baseball
Bill Steele (cave explorer) (born 1948 as Charles William Steele), American speleologist
Bill Steele (ice hockey) (born 1952), ice hockey player in the World Hockey Association
Bill Steele (sailor) (born 1940), Hong Kong Olympic sailor
Billy Steele (born 1956), Scottish former footballer 
William Steele (actor) (1888–1966), American actor
William Steele (Confederate general) (1819–1885), American Army officer and Confederate general
William Steele (Lord Chancellor of Ireland) (1610–1680), Lord Chancellor of Ireland
William Steele (Pittsburgh), Chief Burgess of the Borough of Pittsburgh, 1812–1813, see list of mayors of Pittsburgh
William Steele (rugby union) (born 1947), former Scotland international rugby union player
Willie Steele (William Samuel Steele, 1923–1989), American athlete
William A. Steele, a character in the serial Ace of Spades
William Steele (Australian Army officer) (1895–1966), Australian Army general
William Steele (cricketer) (born 1946), South African cricketer
William B. Steele (born 1929), United States Army general
William G. Steele (1820–1892), American Democratic Party politician
William H. Steele (New York politician) (1838 –1911), American lawyer and politician
William H. Steele (judge) (born 1951), American jurist
William H. Steele (Wisconsin politician) (1872–1955), American politician
William H. Steele (United States Army officer) (born c. 1955), military officer and former commander of Camp Cropper, a holding facility for security detainees in Iraq
William L. Steele (1875–1949), American architect, mainly in Iowa, Illinois, but briefly in Pittsburgh, Pennsylvania
William Steele (1839–1908), architect of William Steele & Sons Company, in Philadelphia, Pennsylvania
William M. Steele, General Officer in the U.S. Army
William O. Steele (1917–1979), American author
William Randolph Steele (1842–1901), Delegate from the Territory of Wyoming

See also
William Steel (disambiguation)